Smith River is an abandoned emergency airport and weather station in the Liard Country of far northern British Columbia, Canada.  It is located southwest of the junction of Shaw Creek with the Smith River, which enters the Liard between the confluences of the Toad and Coal Rivers.

It is located just south of the British Columbia-Yukon boundary, and is the location of the coldest temperature ever recorded in British Columbia and the eighth-coldest temperature on record in Canada: , on January 31, 1947.

During World War II Smith River was built up and used as an airport base as defense against the Japanese if they should ever invade the mainland of North America. A 6000 ft long runway was built at Smith River, and the government maintained it until the 1970s, at which time the airport was abandoned. In the spring and summer of 1982, a forest fire consumed all the remaining buildings.

See also
List of extreme temperatures in Canada
Smith River Falls-Fort Halkett Provincial Park

References

Unincorporated settlements in British Columbia
Liard Country